Joyce M. Lund (née Ireton) (March 23, 1909 – July 20, 2009) was an American journalist and politician.

Born in Minneapolis, Minnesota, Lund graduated from West High School in Minneapolis. She graduated from University of Minnesota in 1931 with a bachelor's degree in journalism. In 1932, Lund moved to Wabasha, Minnesota. She was an editor and writer for the Wabasha County Herald. She also wrote for the Rochester Post-Bulletin and for Associated Press. Lund served in the Minnesota House of Representatives in 1955 and 1956 and was a Democrat. Lund died at a hospital in Wabasha, Minnesota.

Notes

External links

1909 births
2009 deaths
Politicians from Minneapolis
People from Wabasha, Minnesota
University of Minnesota School of Journalism and Mass Communication alumni
Journalists from Minnesota
Women state legislators in Minnesota
Democratic Party members of the Minnesota House of Representatives
American centenarians
20th-century American women politicians
20th-century American politicians
Women centenarians
20th-century American journalists
21st-century American women